José Romero y Fernández de Landa (27 May 1735 in Huelva – 5 August 1807 in Madrid) was a Spanish naval and army officer and the Spanish Navy's first official naval engineer and ship designer. He designed several two and three deck ships of the line in the late 18th and early 19th centuries which fought at the Battle of Cape St Vincent and the Battle of Trafalgar. He is also notable as the writer of Reglamento de maderas necesarias para la fábrica de los baxeles del Rey (Rules for the wood necessary for building the King's ships).

Life
On 27 May 1752 he joined the Regimiento de Dragones de Edimburgo at Villa de Arcos, commanding a company, but he moved to the navy in 1754. He rose 'alférez de fragata' (ensign) and commanded the 5th Company of the 2nd Battalion of Marines at Ferrol.

On 1 November 1765 he started working at the shipyard at Guarnizo, under the designer Francisco Gautier. In October 1770, on the creation of the Cuerpo de Ingenieros de Marina, he was one of its few officials from the Cuerpo de Oficiales de Guerra to join the new body. He was 'capitán de fragata', Commandant of the Engineers and Engineer General, rising to Engineer General of the Fleet on 28 January 1786.

Warships designed by Landa

112-gun ships

74-gun ships

64 gun ships 
The three 64-gun ships designed by Landa were an extension of his 74-gun designs, changing its main dimensions on a scale of α=49,5/52

Frigates

References

Bibliography

  José Romero Fernández de Landa, Un Ingeniero de Marina del Siglo XVIII, de José María de Juan-García Aguado, Universida de da Coruña, 1998.

External links
 List of ships

1735 births
1807 deaths
Spanish naval architects
Spanish naval officers
Spanish army officers